The Central District of Mirjaveh County is a district (bakhsh) in Mirjaveh County, Sistan and Baluchestan Province, Iran. It was established when Mirjaveh County was established in 2013. At the 2006 census, its population was 45,896, in 8,481 families.  The District has one city: Mirjaveh. The District has two rural districts (dehestan): Ladiz Rural District and Tamin Rural District.

References 

Mirjaveh County
Districts of Sistan and Baluchestan Province
2013 establishments in Iran